what. (also called Bo Burnham: what.) is a 2013 stand-up comedy routine and album by American comedian and musician Bo Burnham. It is his first show following his 2010 comedy special Words Words Words. Like the majority of Burnham's live work, the show consists of musical comedy, prop comedy, miming, observational jokes, and the inversion of established comedy clichés. It received positive reviews.

The live performance debuted at the Regency Ball Room in San Francisco on December 17, 2013, while the album is derived from a live performance of the same set at the Barrymore Theatre in Madison, Wisconsin. In addition to the live performance, the album has five studio tracks: "Repeat Stuff", "Eff", "Nerds", "Channel 5: The Musical", and "Hell of a Ride". Unlike the other tracks, "Repeat Stuff" was performed during the live show (as a piano-only version) and was later released as a single with a music video. what. was released on YouTube and Netflix on December 17, 2013, and the album was released via iTunes the next day.

Background 
Burnham rose to fame for posting songs on his YouTube page with satirical, funny, and offensive slants. He signed to Comedy Central Records and released his debut EP, Bo fo Sho, in 2008. He released his debut album, Bo Burnham, in 2009. He toured extensively during this time, gathering material for his first official Comedy Central stand-up hour. Words Words Words was recorded in 2010 at the House of Blues in Boston and received acclaim. Burnham later published a New York Times Best Selling book of poetry titled Egghead: Or, You Can't Survive on Ideas Alone and wrote and starred in the mockumentary series Zach Stone Is Gonna Be Famous on MTV.

Burnham spent three years writing what., which was released on YouTube and Netflix for free on December 17, 2013, with money Burnham made from touring used to finance the special. The YouTube video has over 24 million views as of August 2022. Burnham experienced 12 panic attacks while touring for what. but had never had panic attacks prior to this. This influenced the writing of his next stand-up performance, Make Happy (2016), after which he quit live comedy until returning with Inside (2021).

Album 
what. was released by Comedy Central Records as a download on both Amazon and the iTunes Store on December 17, 2013. The album features five new studio songs: "Repeat Stuff", "Eff", "Nerds", "Channel 5: The Musical", and "Hell of a Ride". Unlike the other tracks, "Repeat Stuff" was performed during the live show (as a piano-only version) and was later released as a single with a music video which has gained over 16 million YouTube views as of October 2021.

Track listing

Reception 
Reception to what. has been positive. Mark Monahan of The Telegraph writes, "If his Edinburgh debut was more impressive than it was laugh-out-loud funny, this lightning-fast, constantly wrong-footing, even more ambitious follow-up is supremely both", and gave the show 5 out of 5 stars. Brian Logan of The Guardian gave the show 4 out of 5 stars, describing it as a "full-frontal assault of music and meta-comedy that leaves you gasping for air", with "not a line out of place, nor one that isn't in there for destabilising comic effect", though Logan noted that "Burnham's comedy has a depressive streak, and his material is often base". Another writer in The Guardian summarised the show by writing, "Burnham mixes the utterly base with the sophisticated, meshing hip-hop-influenced songs that reference Shakespeare, and feature plenty of dick jokes." Jason Zinoman of the New York Times writes that the show has a "manic satirical style", which is "ambitious, and sometimes inspired" but contains "a tension at the core of this show that remains unresolved".

Chart positions 
what. debuted on the Billboard Comedy Albums chart at position #2, on January 4, 2014, peaking at #1 on January 18, 2014, and remaining on the chart for 77 weeks. It was on the Independent Albums chart for 4 weeks, peaking at position #31. what. had first week sales of 10,000 copies.

References

External links
 
 what. at Netflix
 

2013 albums
Comedy albums by American artists
Stand-up comedy albums
2010s comedy albums
Bo Burnham albums
Films directed by Bo Burnham